Christopher Donaldson is a Canadian film and television editor. He is most noted for his work on the film Crimes of the Future, for which he received a Canadian Screen Award nomination for Best Editing at the 11th Canadian Screen Awards in 2023.

He has previously been nominated for Best Picture Editing in a Dramatic Program or Series numerous times for his work in television, winning at the 23rd Gemini Awards in 2008 for his work on The Border, and receiving nods at the 19th Gemini Awards in 2004 and the 22nd Gemini Awards in 2007 for Slings & Arrows, the 26th Gemini Awards in 2011 and the 2nd Canadian Screen Awards in 2014 for Flashpoint, and at the 5th Canadian Screen Awards in 2017 for Vikings.

Filmography

Film

Television

References

External links

Canadian film editors
Canadian television editors
Living people
Canadian Screen Award winners